The Nardi FN.305 was an Italian fighter trainer and liaison monoplane developed by the Fratelli Nardi company.

Development
The FN.305 was designed as a trainer and liaison aircraft and the prototype first flew on 19 January 1935. The FN.305 was a low-wing cantilever monoplane of mixed construction. It had tailskid landing gear, with the main gear retracting inwards. It was powered by a nose-mounted 200 hp (149 kW) Fiat A.70S inline piston engine. The prototype was a tandem two-seater with an enclosed cockpit. It was intended to produce both single-seat and two-seat variants and the next prototype was a single-seat fighter trainer followed by a two-seat basic trainer prototype which both had open cockpits. Two long-range FN.305D variants were then produced powered by a 200 hp (149 kW) Walter Bora radial engine. The first FN.305D was a two-seater which was used on a record-breaking flight between Rome and Addis Ababa in March 1939 gaining a class record for covering the 4463.8 km (2,773,68 miles) at an average speed of 240 km/h (149 mph). The second FN.305D was a single-seater bought by Yugoslavia for an aborted attempt at a nonstop North Atlantic flight.

The prototype was re-engined with an Alfa Romeo 115 engine as the FN.305A which then entered production by Piaggio as the Nardi works were not large enough. The Italian Air Force had ordered 258 aircraft, most of them two-seat FN.305A fighter trainers and liaison aircraft. A few of the aircraft were completed as single-seat open-cockpit FN.305Cs and enclosed-cockpit FN.305Ds. Following the Italian order in 1938 nine aircraft were sold to Chile and 31 to Romania. Romania then built 124 aircraft under licence by SET. The largest export order came from France but only 41 had been delivered when Italy declared war on France in June 1940. The final export customer was Hungary which ordered 50.

An improved version was developed as the Nardi FN.315.

Variants

FN.305
Prototype
FN.305A
Two-seater and main production variant.
FN.305B
Single-seat open cockpit variant.
FN.305C
Single-seat enclosed cockpit variant
FN.305D
Long-range variant with a 200hp (149kW) Walter Bora radial engine, two built, one single-seater and one two-seater.

Operators

Bulgarian Air Force - one aircraft

French Air Force - 41 aircraft

Royal Hungarian Air Force - 50 aircraft

Regia Aeronautica - 285 aircraft
Italian Co-Belligerent Air Force

Aeronautica Militare Italiana operated 10 aircraft until 1948

Royal Romanian Air Force - 31 aircraft

Chilean Air Force - 9 aircraft

Specifications (FN.305A)

See also

References

Bibliography

 
 

FN.305
1930s Italian military trainer aircraft
Single-engined tractor aircraft
Low-wing aircraft
FN.305
Aircraft first flown in 1935